In mathematics, the gamma function (represented by , the capital letter gamma from the Greek alphabet) is one commonly used extension of the factorial function to complex numbers. The gamma function is defined for all complex numbers except the non-positive integers.  For every positive integer , 

Derived by Daniel Bernoulli, for complex numbers with a positive real part, the gamma function is defined via a convergent improper integral:

The gamma function then is defined as the analytic continuation of this integral function to a meromorphic function that is holomorphic in the whole complex plane except zero and the negative integers, where the function has simple poles.

The gamma function has no zeroes, so the reciprocal gamma function  is an entire function. In fact, the gamma function corresponds to the Mellin transform of the negative exponential function:

Other extensions of the factorial function do exist, but the gamma function is the most popular and useful. It is a component in various probability-distribution functions, and as such it is applicable in the fields of probability and statistics, as well as combinatorics.

Motivation 

The gamma function can be seen as a solution to the following interpolation problem:
A plot of the first few factorials suggests that such a curve can be drawn, but it would be preferable to have a formula that precisely describes the curve, in which the number of operations does not depend on the size of . The simple formula for the factorial, cannot be used directly for non-integer values of  since it is only valid when  is a natural number (or positive integer). There are, relatively speaking, no such simple solutions for factorials; no finite combination of sums, products, powers, exponential functions, or logarithms will suffice to express ; but it is possible to find a general formula for factorials using tools such as integrals and limits from calculus. A good solution to this is the gamma function.

There are infinitely many continuous extensions of the factorial to non-integers: infinitely many curves can be drawn through any set of isolated points. The gamma function is the most useful solution in practice, being analytic (except at the non-positive integers), and it can be defined in several equivalent ways. Such a function is known as a pseudogamma function, the most famous being the Hadamard function.

A more restrictive property than satisfying the above interpolation is to satisfy the recurrence relation defining a translated version of the factorial function,

for any positive real number . One of several ways to resolve the ambiguity comes from the Bohr–Mollerup theorem. It states that when the condition that  be logarithmically convex (or "super-convex", meaning that  is convex) is added, it uniquely determines  for positive, real inputs.

Definition

Main definition 
The notation  is due to Legendre. If the real part of the complex number  is strictly positive, then the integral

converges absolutely, and is known as the Euler integral of the second kind. (Euler's integral of the first kind is the beta function.) Using integration by parts, one sees that:

Recognizing that  as 

We can calculate 

Thus we can show that  for any positive integer  by induction.  Specifically, the base case is that , and the induction step is that .

It is this extended version that is commonly referred to as the gamma function.

Alternative definitions

Euler's definition as an infinite product 
For a fixed integer , as the integer  increases, we have that 

If  is not an integer then it is not possible to say whether this equation is true because we have not yet (in this section) defined the factorial function for non-integers.  However, we do get a unique extension of the factorial function to the non-integers by insisting that this equation continue to hold when the arbitrary integer  is replaced by an arbitrary complex number ,

Multiplying both sides by  gives

This infinite product, which is due to Euler, converges for all complex numbers  except the non-positive integers, which fail because of a division by zero.

Weierstrass's definition 
The definition for the gamma function due to Weierstrass is also valid for all complex numbers  except the non-positive integers:

where  is the Euler–Mascheroni constant.

A simple proof of the product is as follows:

Where the fact that  was used in the last line.

Properties

General 

Other important functional equations for the gamma function are Euler's reflection formula

which implies

 
and the Legendre duplication formula

Since 

the gamma function can be represented as

Integrating by parts  times yields

which is equal to

This can be rewritten as

We can use this to evaluate the left-hand side of the reflection formula:

It can be proved that

Then

Euler's reflection formula follows:

The beta function can be represented as

Setting  yields

After the substitution  we get

The function  is even, hence

Now assume

Then

This implies

Since

the Legendre duplication formula follows:

The duplication formula is a special case of the multiplication theorem (see  Eq. 5.5.6):

A simple but useful property, which can be seen from the limit definition, is:

If the real part is an integer or a half-integer, this can be finitely expressed in closed form:

Applying the recurrence relation to the second term, we have

which with simple rearrangement gives

Perhaps the best-known value of the gamma function at a non-integer argument is

In general, for non-negative integer values of  we have:

where the double factorial . See Particular values of the gamma function for calculated values.

It might be tempting to generalize the result that  by looking for a formula for other individual values  where  is rational, especially because according to Gauss's digamma theorem, it is possible to do so for the closely related digamma function at every rational value. However, these numbers  are not known to be expressible by themselves in terms of elementary functions. In general, when computing values of the gamma function, we must settle for numerical approximations.

The derivatives of the gamma function are described in terms of the polygamma function, :

For a positive integer  the derivative of the gamma function can be calculated as follows:

For  the th derivative of the gamma function is:

Using the identity

we have in particular the Laurent series expansion of the gamma function

Inequalities 
When restricted to the positive real numbers, the gamma function is a strictly logarithmically convex function.  This property may be stated in any of the following three equivalent ways:
 For any positive real number , 
The last of these statements is, essentially by definition, the same as the statement that , where  is the polygamma function of order 1. To prove the logarithmic convexity of the gamma function, it therefore suffices to observe that  has a series representation which, for positive real , consists of only positive terms.

There are also bounds on ratios of gamma functions. The best-known is Gautschi's inequality, which says that for any positive real number  and any ,

Stirling's formula 

Residues 
The behavior for non-positive  is more intricate. Euler's integral does not converge for  but the function it defines in the positive complex half-plane has a unique analytic continuation to the negative half-plane. One way to find that analytic continuation is to use Euler's integral for positive arguments and extend the domain to negative numbers by repeated application of the recurrence formula,

choosing  such that  is positive. The product in the denominator is zero when  equals any of the integers . Thus, the gamma function must be undefined at those points to avoid division by zero; it is a meromorphic function with simple poles at the non-positive integers.

For the simple pole  we rewrite recurrence formula as:

and the denominator 

So the residues of the gamma function at those points are:

Minima and maxima
On the real line, the gamma function has a local minimum at  where it attains the value . The gamma function rises to either side of this minimum.

The extrema values of the Gamma function between the non-positive integers are
,
,
,
,
,
etc.

Integral representations 
There are many formulas, besides the Euler integral of the second kind, that express the gamma function as an integral.

and

The last integral in particular makes clear the connection between the gamma function at half integer arguments and the Gaussian integral: if we let  we get  .

The integral on the right-hand side may be interpreted as a Laplace transform.  That is,

Assume  is not an integer. Then Hankel's formula for the gamma function is:

The reflection formula leads to the closely related expression 

again valid whenever  is not an integer.

Continued fraction representation
The gamma function can also be represented by a sum of two continued fractions:

where .

Fourier series expansion 
The logarithm of the gamma function has the following Fourier series expansion for 

which was for a long time attributed to Ernst Kummer, who derived it in 1847. However, Iaroslav Blagouchine discovered that Carl Johan Malmsten first derived this series in 1842.

Raabe's formula 
In 1840 Joseph Ludwig Raabe proved that

In particular, if  then

The latter can be derived taking the logarithm in the above multiplication formula, which gives an expression for the Riemann sum of the integrand. Taking the limit for  gives the formula.

Pi function 
An alternative notation that was originally introduced by Gauss is the -function, which, in terms of the gamma function, is

so that  for every non-negative integer .

Using the pi function the reflection formula takes on the form

where  is the normalized sinc function, while the multiplication theorem takes on the form

We also sometimes find

which is an entire function, defined for every complex number, just like the reciprocal gamma function. That  is entire entails it has no poles, so , like , has no zeros.

The volume of an -ellipsoid with radii  can be expressed as

Relation to other functions 
 In the first integral above, which defines the gamma function, the limits of integration are fixed. The upper and lower incomplete gamma functions are the functions obtained by allowing the lower or upper (respectively) limit of integration to vary.
 The gamma function is related to the beta function by the formula 
 The logarithmic derivative of the gamma function is called the digamma function; higher derivatives are the polygamma functions.
 The analog of the gamma function over a finite field or a finite ring is the Gaussian sums, a type of exponential sum.
 The reciprocal gamma function is an entire function and has been studied as a specific topic.
 The gamma function also shows up in an important relation with the Riemann zeta function, . The logarithm of the gamma function satisfies the following formula due to Lerch:  where  is the Hurwitz zeta function,  is the Riemann zeta function and the prime denotes differentiation in the first variable.
 The gamma function is related to the stretched exponential function. For instance, the moments of that function are

Particular values 

Including up to the first 20 digits after the decimal point, some particular values of the gamma function are:

The reciprocal gamma function is well defined and analytic at these values (and in the entire complex plane):

The log-gamma function 

Because the gamma and factorial functions grow so rapidly for moderately large arguments, many computing environments include a function that returns the natural logarithm of the gamma function (often given the name lgamma or lngamma in programming environments or gammaln in spreadsheets); this grows much more slowly, and for combinatorial calculations allows adding and subtracting logs instead of multiplying and dividing very large values. It is often defined as

The digamma function, which is the derivative of this function, is also commonly seen.
In the context of technical and physical applications, e.g. with wave propagation, the functional equation

In particular, starting with a good approximation for a  with large real part one may go step by step down to the desired . Following an indication of Carl Friedrich Gauss, Rocktaeschel (1922) proposed for  an approximation for large :

In a more "natural" presentation:

The Gamma function also has Stirling Series (derived by Charles Hermite in 1900) equal to

Properties 
The Bohr–Mollerup theorem states that among all functions extending the factorial functions to the positive real numbers, only the gamma function is log-convex, that is, its natural logarithm is convex on the positive real axis. Another characterisation is given by the Wielandt theorem.

The gamma function is the unique function that simultaneously satisfies
,
 for all complex numbers  except the non-positive integers, and,
for integer ,  for all complex numbers .

In a certain sense, the  function is the more natural form; it makes some intrinsic attributes of the function clearer. A striking example is the Taylor series of  around 1:

So, using the following property:

we can find an integral representation for the  function:

There also exist special formulas for the logarithm of the gamma function for rational . 

see.
This formula is sometimes used for numerical computation, since the integrand decreases very quickly.

Integration over log-gamma 

The integral

can be expressed in terms of the Barnes -function (see Barnes -function for a proof):

where .

It can also be written in terms of the Hurwitz zeta function:

When  it follows that

and this is a consequence of Raabe's formula as well. O. Espinosa and V. Moll derived a similar formula for the integral of the square of :

D. H. Bailey and his co-authors gave an evaluation for

when  in terms of the Tornheim–Witten zeta function and its derivatives.

In addition, it is also known that

Approximations 

Complex values of the gamma function can be approximated using Stirling's approximation or the Lanczos approximation, 

This is precise in the sense that the ratio of the approximation to the true value approaches 1 in the limit as  goes to infinity.

For any positive number  the gamma function can be written

Thus, the gamma function can be evaluated to  bits of precision with the above series.

A fast algorithm for calculation of the Euler gamma function for any algebraic argument (including rational) was constructed by E.A. Karatsuba.

Applications 
One author describes the gamma function as "Arguably, the most common special function, or the least 'special' of them. The other transcendental functions […] are called 'special' because you could conceivably avoid some of them by staying away from many specialized mathematical topics. On the other hand, the gamma function  is most difficult to avoid."

Integration problems 

The gamma function finds application in such diverse areas as quantum physics, astrophysics and fluid dynamics. The gamma distribution, which is formulated in terms of the gamma function, is used in statistics to model a wide range of processes; for example, the time between occurrences of earthquakes.

The primary reason for the gamma function's usefulness in such contexts is the prevalence of expressions of the type   which describe processes that decay exponentially in time or space. Integrals of such expressions can occasionally be solved in terms of the gamma function when no elementary solution exists.

The fact that the integration is performed along the entire positive real line might signify that the gamma function describes the cumulation of a time-dependent process that continues indefinitely, or the value might be the total of a distribution in an infinite space.

(The ordinary gamma function, obtained by integrating across the entire positive real line, is sometimes called the complete gamma function for contrast.)

An important category of exponentially decaying functions is that of Gaussian functions

and integrals thereof, such as the error function. There are many interrelations between these functions and the gamma function; notably, the factor  obtained by evaluating  is the "same" as that found in the normalizing factor of the error function and the normal distribution.

The integrals we have discussed so far involve transcendental functions, but the gamma function also arises from integrals of purely algebraic functions. In particular, the arc lengths of ellipses and of the lemniscate, which are curves defined by algebraic equations, are given by elliptic integrals that in special cases can be evaluated in terms of the gamma function. The gamma function can also be used to calculate "volume" and "area" of -dimensional hyperspheres.

Calculating products 
The gamma function's ability to generalize factorial products immediately leads to applications in many areas of mathematics; in combinatorics, and by extension in areas such as probability theory and the calculation of power series. Many expressions involving products of successive integers can be written as some combination of factorials, the most important example perhaps being that of the binomial coefficient

The example of binomial coefficients motivates why the properties of the gamma function when extended to negative numbers are natural. A binomial coefficient gives the number of ways to choose  elements from a set of  elements; if , there are of course no ways. If ,  is the factorial of a negative integer and hence infinite if we use the gamma function definition of factorials—dividing by infinity gives the expected value of 0.

We can replace the factorial by a gamma function to extend any such formula to the complex numbers. Generally, this works for any product wherein each factor is a rational function of the index variable, by factoring the rational function into linear expressions.

If we have a way to calculate the gamma function numerically, it is a breeze to calculate numerical values of such products. The number of gamma functions in the right-hand side depends only on the degree of the polynomials, so it does not matter whether  equals 5 or 105. By taking the appropriate limits, the equation can also be made to hold even when the left-hand product contains zeros or poles.

By taking limits, certain rational products with infinitely many factors can be evaluated in terms of the gamma function as well. Due to the Weierstrass factorization theorem, analytic functions can be written as infinite products, and these can sometimes be represented as finite products or quotients of the gamma function. We have already seen one striking example: the reflection formula essentially represents the sine function as the product of two gamma functions. Starting from this formula, the exponential function as well as all the trigonometric and hyperbolic functions can be expressed in terms of the gamma function.

More functions yet, including the hypergeometric function and special cases thereof, can be represented by means of complex contour integrals of products and quotients of the gamma function, called Mellin–Barnes integrals.

Analytic number theory 

An application of the gamma function is the study of the Riemann zeta function. A fundamental property of the Riemann zeta function is its functional equation:

Among other things, this provides an explicit form for the analytic continuation of the zeta function to a meromorphic function in the complex plane and leads to an immediate proof that the zeta function has infinitely many so-called "trivial" zeros on the real line. Borwein et al. call this formula "one of the most beautiful findings in mathematics". Another contender for that title might be

Both formulas were derived by Bernhard Riemann in his seminal 1859 paper "Ueber die Anzahl der Primzahlen unter einer gegebenen Größe" ("On the Number of Primes Less Than a Given Magnitude"), one of the milestones in the development of analytic number theory—the branch of mathematics that studies prime numbers using the tools of mathematical analysis. Factorial numbers, considered as discrete objects, are an important concept in classical number theory because they contain many prime factors, but Riemann found a use for their continuous extension that arguably turned out to be even more important.

History 
The gamma function has caught the interest of some of the most prominent mathematicians of all time. Its history, notably documented by Philip J. Davis in an article that won him the 1963 Chauvenet Prize, reflects many of the major developments within mathematics since the 18th century. In the words of Davis, "each generation has found something of interest to say about the gamma function. Perhaps the next generation will also."

18th century: Euler and Stirling 

The problem of extending the factorial to non-integer arguments was apparently first considered by Daniel Bernoulli and Christian Goldbach in the 1720s. In particular, in a letter from Bernoulli to Goldbach dated 6 October 1729 Bernoulli introduced the product representation

which is well defined for real values of  other than the negative integers.

Leonard Euler later gave two different definitions: the first was not his integral but an infinite product that is well defined for all complex numbers  other than the negative integers,

of which he informed Goldbach in a letter dated 13 October 1729. He wrote to Goldbach again on 8 January 1730, to announce his discovery of the integral representation

By the change of variables , this becomes the familiar Euler integral. Euler published his results in the paper "De progressionibus transcendentibus seu quarum termini generales algebraice dari nequeunt" ("On transcendental progressions, that is, those whose general terms cannot be given algebraically"), submitted to the St. Petersburg Academy on 28 November 1729. Euler further discovered some of the gamma function's important functional properties, including the reflection formula.

James Stirling, a contemporary of Euler, also attempted to find a continuous expression for the factorial and came up with what is now known as Stirling's formula. Extensions of his formula that correct the error were given by Stirling himself and by Jacques Philippe Marie Binet.

19th century: Gauss, Weierstrass and Legendre 

Carl Friedrich Gauss rewrote Euler's product as

and used this formula to discover new properties of the gamma function. Although Euler was a pioneer in the theory of complex variables, he does not appear to have considered the factorial of a complex number, as instead Gauss first did. Gauss also proved the multiplication theorem of the gamma function and investigated the connection between the gamma function and elliptic integrals.

Karl Weierstrass further established the role of the gamma function in complex analysis, starting from yet another product representation,

where  is the Euler–Mascheroni constant. Inspired by this result, he proved what is known as the Weierstrass factorization theorem—that any entire function can be written as a product over its zeros in the complex plane; a generalization of the fundamental theorem of algebra.

The name gamma function and the symbol  were introduced by Adrien-Marie Legendre around 1811; Legendre also rewrote Euler's integral definition in its modern form. Although the symbol is an upper-case Greek gamma, there is no accepted standard for whether the function name should be written "gamma function" or "Gamma function" (some authors simply write "-function"). The alternative "pi function" notation  due to Gauss is sometimes encountered in older literature, but Legendre's notation is dominant in modern works.

It is justified to ask why we distinguish between the "ordinary factorial" and the gamma function by using distinct symbols, and particularly why the gamma function should be normalized to  instead of simply using "". Consider that the notation for exponents, has been generalized from integers to complex numbers  without any change. Legendre's motivation for the normalization does not appear to be known, and has been criticized as cumbersome by some (the 20th-century mathematician Cornelius Lanczos, for example, called it "void of any rationality" and would instead use ). Legendre's normalization does simplify some formulae, but complicates others. From a modern point of view, the Legendre normalization of the Gamma function is the integral of the additive character  against the multiplicative character  with respect to the Haar measure  on the Lie group . Thus this normalization makes it clearer that the gamma function is a continuous analogue of a Gauss sum.

19th–20th centuries: characterizing the gamma function 
It is somewhat problematic that a large number of definitions have been given for the gamma function. Although they describe the same function, it is not entirely straightforward to prove the equivalence. Stirling never proved that his extended formula corresponds exactly to Euler's gamma function; a proof was first given by Charles Hermite in 1900. Instead of finding a specialized proof for each formula, it would be desirable to have a general method of identifying the gamma function.

One way to prove would be to find a differential equation that characterizes the gamma function. Most special functions in applied mathematics arise as solutions to differential equations, whose solutions are unique. However, the gamma function does not appear to satisfy any simple differential equation. Otto Hölder proved in 1887 that the gamma function at least does not satisfy any algebraic differential equation by showing that a solution to such an equation could not satisfy the gamma function's recurrence formula, making it a transcendentally transcendental function. This result is known as Hölder's theorem.

A definite and generally applicable characterization of the gamma function was not given until 1922. Harald Bohr and Johannes Mollerup then proved what is known as the Bohr–Mollerup theorem: that the gamma function is the unique solution to the factorial recurrence relation that is positive and logarithmically convex for positive  and whose value at 1 is 1 (a function is logarithmically convex if its logarithm is convex). Another characterisation is given by the Wielandt theorem.

The Bohr–Mollerup theorem is useful because it is relatively easy to prove logarithmic convexity for any of the different formulas used to define the gamma function. Taking things further, instead of defining the gamma function by any particular formula, we can choose the conditions of the Bohr–Mollerup theorem as the definition, and then pick any formula we like that satisfies the conditions as a starting point for studying the gamma function. This approach was used by the Bourbaki group.

Borwein & Corless review three centuries of work on the gamma function.

Reference tables and software 

Although the gamma function can be calculated virtually as easily as any mathematically simpler function with a modern computer—even with a programmable pocket calculator—this was of course not always the case. Until the mid-20th century, mathematicians relied on hand-made tables; in the case of the gamma function, notably a table computed by Gauss in 1813 and one computed by Legendre in 1825.

According to Michael Berry, "the publication in J&E of a three-dimensional graph showing the poles of the gamma function in the complex plane acquired an almost iconic status."

There was in fact little practical need for anything but real values of the gamma function until the 1930s, when applications for the complex gamma function were discovered in theoretical physics. As electronic computers became available for the production of tables in the 1950s, several extensive tables for the complex gamma function were published to meet the demand, including a table accurate to 12 decimal places from the U.S. National Bureau of Standards.

Double-precision floating-point implementations of the gamma function and its logarithm are now available in most scientific computing software and special functions libraries, for example TK Solver, Matlab, GNU Octave, and the GNU Scientific Library. The gamma function was also added to the C standard library (math.h). Arbitrary-precision implementations are available in most computer algebra systems, such as Mathematica and Maple. PARI/GP, MPFR and MPFUN contain free arbitrary-precision implementations. In some software calculators, e.g. Windows Calculator and GNOME Calculator, the factorial function returns Γ(x+1) when the input x is a non-integer value.

See also 

 Ascending factorial
 Cahen–Mellin integral
 Elliptic gamma function
 Gauss's constant
 Hadamard's gamma function
 Lanczos approximation
 Multiple gamma function
 Multivariate gamma function
 -adic gamma function
 Pochhammer -symbol
 -gamma function
 Ramanujan's master theorem
 Spouge's approximation
 Stirling's approximation

Notes

Further reading

External links 

 NIST Digital Library of Mathematical Functions:Gamma function
 Pascal Sebah and Xavier Gourdon. Introduction to the Gamma Function. In PostScript and HTML formats.
 C++ reference for std::tgamma
 Examples of problems involving the gamma function can be found at Exampleproblems.com.
 
 Wolfram gamma function evaluator (arbitrary precision)
 
 Volume of n-Spheres and the Gamma Function at MathPages

Gamma and related functions
Special hypergeometric functions
Meromorphic functions